Wayne Richard Moore (November 20, 1931 – February 20, 2015) was an American competition swimmer, Olympic champion, and former world record-holder.

Moore represented the United States at the 1952 Summer Olympics in Helsinki, Finland, where he won a gold medal in the men's 4×200-meter freestyle relay with U.S. teammates Bill Woolsey, Ford Konno and Jimmy McLane.  Individually, Moore also competed in the men's 400-meter freestyle at the 1952 Olympics, finishing in sixth place in the event final.

Moore was born in Bridgeport, Connecticut in 1931, the son of Richard F. and Mary S. Moore.  He was a 1945 graduate of Warren Harding High School, and graduated from Yale University in 1953 with a degree in economics. Swimming for the Yale Bulldogs under coach Bob Kiphuth, Moore won NCAA titles in the 220-yard freestyle in 1952 and 440-yard freestyle in 1953. After college, Moore was drafted in the U.S. Army and served during the Korean War.

Moore's father had founded the Moore Special Tool Company, of Bridgeport, a tool and die maker. This specialised in ultra high-precision machine tools, such as jig borers and jig grinders. Wayne went to work for this company in 1953 and in time became its president. In 1970 he authored the book Foundations of Mechanical Accuracy, which is now seen as a standard text for the design of precise and stable machinery. He also became chairman of the National Machine Tool Builders Association (NMTB), the Acme United Corporation, and was a director of the American Precision Museum and the Bridgeport Engineering Institute.

Moore died February 20, 2015; he was 83 years old.

Publications

See also
 List of Olympic medalists in swimming (men)
 List of Yale University people
 World record progression 4 × 200 metres freestyle relay

References

1931 births
2015 deaths
American male freestyle swimmers
World record setters in swimming
Olympic gold medalists for the United States in swimming
Sportspeople from Bridgeport, Connecticut
Swimmers at the 1952 Summer Olympics
Swimmers at the 1955 Pan American Games
Yale Bulldogs men's swimmers
Medalists at the 1952 Summer Olympics
Pan American Games gold medalists for the United States
Pan American Games medalists in swimming
American mechanical engineers
Medalists at the 1955 Pan American Games
Warren Harding High School alumni